Fazl Rural District may refer to:
 Fazl Rural District (Hamadan Province)
 Fazl Rural District (Razavi Khorasan Province)